Kustas is an Estonian masculine given name; a cognate of the Nordic given name Gustav, which is also found in Estonia. Other variants and diminutives of Kustas found in Estonia include Kustav, Kusti, and Kusto.

As of 1 January 2021, Kustas was the 1,095th most popular male name in Estonia. 

Individuals bearing the name Kustas include:

Kustas Kikerpuu (1937–2008), composer, jazz musician and conductor
Kustas Köidam (1879–1963), politician
Kustas Kotsar (1872–1942), writer and journalist
Kustas Põldmaa (1897–1977), writer and conservationist 
Kustas Tonkmann (1882–1942), politician
Kustas Utuste (1884–1941), military major

References

Masculine given names
Estonian masculine given names